This article details the various political parties in the Democratic Republic of the Congo.

The Democratic Republic of the Congo has seen extensive civil conflict since independence in 1960, and no free and fair election had been held there until 2006. In the absence of an effective central government, most political groups (especially those in the interior) exist solely to control territory and enforce allegiance to certain leaders instead of performing the typical party functions of electoral participation and ideological debate.

602 parties are registered with the Ministry of Internal Affairs.

The parties

Historical parties
Alliance of Democratic Forces for the Liberation of Congo (Alliance des Forces Démocratiques pour la Liberation du Congo)
ABAKO
 Association of Indigenous Personnel of the Colony (APIC)
 Center of African Grouping (CEREA)
 Movement for the National Congolese Progress (MPNC)
 African Solidarity Party (PSA)
 People's National Party (PNP)
 Union of Mongo (UNIMO)

References

See also

 Lists of political parties

Congo, Democratic Republic of the
 
Political parties
Political aprties
Congo, Democratic Republic of the